Crosbysaurus is a genus of extinct archosauromorph that lived in the Late Triassic of Arizona, New Mexico, North Carolina, Texas, and Utah. It is known from the Chinle Formation and Dockum Group rock units from the southwestern United States. The type species is C. harrisae, and the only known material includes teeth. 11 specimens are known, each including a single tooth.

Crosbysaurus was originally identified as an ornithischian dinosaur by Andrew Heckert when it was first described in 2004. Further work has shown that it is likely an archosauromorph based on the features of its teeth, and it may belong to Archosauriformes. The taxon is likely valid as it differs from other genera from the same region known from teeth like Revueltosaurus, Tecovasaurus, Krzyzanowskisaurus, Lucianosaurus, and Protecovasaurus.

Description
The teeth of Crosbysaurus are triangular in outline with serrations on both edges. Almost all specimens have "compound denticles"; serrations with their own subdivisions. The serrations on the trailing (posterior/distal) edge of the tooth are always larger than the leading (anterior/mesial) edge. The teeth are small, approximately 3-5 millimeters tall. Owing to their blunt outline it is presumed that Crosbysaurus was a herbivore.

References 

 https://translate.google.com/translate?hl=en&sl=de&u=http://simonkrauter.ntux.at/newdinorama/dinos/c/crosbysaurus/daten.htm&prev=/search%3Fq%3DCrosbysaurus%2B%26hl%3Den%26lr%3D%26sa%3DG

Prehistoric archosauriforms
Prehistoric reptile genera
Late Triassic reptiles of North America
Fossil taxa described in 2004